The canton of Charente-Nord is an administrative division of the Charente department, southwestern France. It was created at the French canton reorganisation which came into effect in March 2015. Its seat is in Ruffec.

It consists of the following communes:
 
Les Adjots
Aigre
Barbezières
Barro
Bernac
Bessé
Bioussac
Brettes
Charmé
La Chèvrerie
Condac
Courcôme
Couture
Ébréon
Empuré
La Faye
La Forêt-de-Tessé
Fouqueure
Les Gours
Ligné
Londigny
Longré
Lupsault
La Magdeleine
Montjean
Nanteuil-en-Vallée
Oradour
Paizay-Naudouin-Embourie
Poursac
Raix
Ranville-Breuillaud
Ruffec
Saint-Fraigne
Saint-Georges
Saint-Gourson
Saint-Martin-du-Clocher
Saint-Sulpice-de-Ruffec
Salles-de-Villefagnan
Souvigné
Taizé-Aizie
Theil-Rabier
Tusson
Verdille
Verteuil-sur-Charente
Villefagnan
Villiers-le-Roux

References

Cantons of Charente